Adenomus is a small genus of true toads, with only two species, endemic to Sri Lanka. Adenomus kandianus was considered as extinct for 133 years, but was rediscovered in October 2009 in the Kandy area.

Description
Adenomus are slender toads that lack the supraorbital ridge (present in other Sri Lankan bufonids) and have smooth finger edges (versus granular). The largest species is Adenomus kelaartii where females can attain  in snout–vent length.

Species
There are two species:

The species are syntopic in parts of their range, but generally speaking Adenomus kandianus is a lower-altitude species whereas Adenomus kelaartii is a high-altitude species.

A third species, Adenomus dasi (Das's dwarf toad) was recognized in 2015 as being a synonym of Adenomus kandianus; the two show some morphological differences but negligible genetic divergence.

References

 
Amphibian genera
Amphibians of Sri Lanka
Endemic fauna of Sri Lanka
Taxa named by Edward Drinker Cope